Heide Hinrichs (born 1976) is a German artist living and working out of Brussels, Belgium. Hinrichs works mainly in installation and sculpture manipulating everyday objects and found materials to symbolize emotion, mental states and gestures of the body in a neo-baroque and post-minimalist style.

Early life and career

Heide Hinrichs was born in 1976 in Oldenburg, Germany. From 1996 to 2000, she studied at the University of Kassel, then at the Dresden Academy of Fine Arts in Dresden, Germany for another two years under Ulrike Grossarth. Hinrichs completed a two-year postgraduate degree at the Royal Academy of Fine Arts in Antwerp (2006), where she currently teaches.

Notable shows
 ringing critical forests, Kiosk, Ghent, Belgium, 2020
Echoes, Kunstverein Heidelberg, Heidelberg, Germany, 2012
 Rose Belongs to the Lotus, Circulation waterside contemporary, London, UK, 2012
 Borrowed Tails, Seattle Art Museum, Seattle, USA, 2009

Recognition
 Villa Romana Prize, Florence, Florence, Italy, 2013
 MMCA Seoul International Residency Program, Seoul, South Korea, 2014

References

1976 births
Living people
21st-century German artists
People from Oldenburg (city)